Sangram Yadav is an Indian politician. He served as a member of 16th and 17th Legislative Assembly, Uttar Pradesh . He represents the Atraulia constituency in Azamgarh district of Uttar Pradesh, India, and is a member of the Samajwadi Party.

Early life 
Yadav was born on 3 October 1971 in Senpur, Azamgarh to his father Balram Yadav (5 time MLA from Atraulia). He married Sandhya Yadav in 2005 and they had two sons.

He earned a M.A. degree in 1994, an LLB in 1997, and a PhD in 2005 from University of Allahabad.

Political career
In 2012, he was elected by Atraulia constituency as a member of Samajwadi Party. He served as MLA for two consecutive terms. In his first term 16th Legislative Assembly of Uttar Pradesh (2012) elections he defeated Bahujan Samaj Party candidate, Surendra Prasad Mishra, by a margin of 43,620 votes.

In his second term 17th Legislative Assembly of Uttar Pradesh (2017), elections he defeated Bhartiya Janata Party candidate Kanhaiya Lal Nishad by a margin of 2,467 votes.

References

Uttar Pradesh MLAs 2017–2022
1971 births
Living people
Samajwadi Party politicians
Uttar Pradesh MLAs 2022–2027
Samajwadi Party politicians from Uttar Pradesh
Uttar Pradesh MLAs 2012–2017